Couvreur (French for slater) may refer to:

 Bénédicte Couvreur, French film producer
 Hilaire Couvreur (1924–1998), Belgian cyclist
 Jessie Catherine Couvreur (1848–1897), Australian novelist
 Joris Couvreur, Belgian ambassador in Bogota, Colombia
 Martine Carrillon-Couvreur (born 1948), member of the National Assembly of France
 Olivier Couvreur (born 1970), French champion driver
 Séraphin Couvreur (1835–1919), French Jesuit sinologist

Lecouvreur may refer to:
 Adrienne Lecouvreur, (1692–1730), French actress
 Adriana Lecouvreur, an opera in four acts by Francesco Cilea

French-language surnames
Occupational surnames